Greg K. (born January 20, 1965) is an American musician known as the bass guitarist and backing vocalist for the rock band The Offspring from 1984 to 2018.

Biography
Greg K. was one of the founding members of the Offspring alongside singer Dexter Holland.  

In August 2019, Kriesel filed a lawsuit against his Offspring bandmates Holland and Wasserman, following an alleged decision by the two in November 2018 to fire Kriesel from the Offspring and exclude him from band related activities such as studio recordings and live performances. Kriesel and his lawyers also alleged that the two conspired to "seize the business, business opportunities, and assets" of Kriesel's stake in the band without compensation. The situation is reminiscent of that of Kriesel's former bandmate and drummer Ron Welty. As the result of his absence from touring, he has been filled in by Tony Kanal of No Doubt and Todd Morse of H2O, with Morse later being named as Kriesel's replacement.

References

External links

1965 births
American punk rock bass guitarists
American male bass guitarists
Living people
Musicians from Glendale, California
The Offspring members
Guitarists from California
American male guitarists
20th-century American guitarists